Phyllogomphoides appendiculatus is a species of dragonfly in the family Gomphidae. It is found in Panama.

Description

References

External links

Photographs at All Odonata

Phyllogomphoides
Insects described in 1899